Bond Arms Inc. is an American firearms manufacturer located in Granbury, Texas which makes derringers and the semiautomatic Bullpup 9.

History

Bond Arms was founded by longtime tool and die maker Greg Bond, in Granbury, Texas.  

Between the 1860's and the mid 1990's, derringers had largely gone unchanged in design or safety until Greg Bond added a trigger guard, invented the "rebounding hammer" and retractable firing pins, and added a crossbolt safety.  The company was formerly known as "Texas Arms" out of Waco, Texas.  Bond Arms became incorporated in 1995 and was licensed by the BATFE as a firearms manufacturer and dealer. 

Greg's brother, Gordon Bond, bought the company from Greg in 2007 and has been owner/president since then.  

Bond Arms is the largest manufacturer of derringers in the firearms industry.

Products

Derringers
Bond Arms derringers are modular and made in a variety of centerfire calibers including .380ACP, 9mm, .40 S&W, .30 Carbine, .327 Fed Mag, 44-40 Win, 44SPL, .45ACP, .45LC, .357Mag/.38Spl, 10mm, and .45 Long Colt /.410 Shotshell.  The three most popular models are the Texas Defender, Rowdy, and Snake Slayer Derringers.  The trigger guard is removable for a more traditional appearance on the original and the Rough series.  Bond Arms constructs their traditional derringers in such a way that a user can change barrels and switch from one caliber to another.  Grips are also constructed in such a way that users can also change between a compact grip to an extended grip to a jumbo grip.  

In late 2014 Bond Arms introduced two California-legal models called the Big Bear and Brown Bear, but they have since ceased all business in California due to Prop 65.

In 2018, Bond Arms introduced the Rough series which are structurally identical to the classical derringer line, but are not as highly polished.  These have a much lower cost per unit and are designed to be used in a tougher environment than the original line.

2020 saw the introduction of the Stinger which is an aluminum frame derringer available only in 9mm and .380ACP as it is only .88" thick and 12oz.  This new line is not compatible with the accessory barrels, and the trigger guard is molded into the rest of the frame.  They are intended for deep concealment.  In summer of 2022, Bond Arms released the Stinger RS (Rough Series) which has a stainless steel frame and weighs 16oz.

Bond Arms Derringer models:

Semiautomatics
Bond Arms acquired the rights to the Boberg XR9-S bullpup semiautomatic pistol, redesigned it and market it as the Bond Arms BullPup 9.  The Bullpup 9 is a 7+1, 9mm with a 3 7/20" barrel.  Available in DAO with an extra magazine included, it has limited availability.

Accessories
Bond arms offers custom grip panels for their guns, a line of holsters, and accessory barrels which are currently only sold through other retailers.

See also
Derringer manufacturers
American Derringer
Cobra Arms
Others
Snake Charmer (shotgun)

References

External links
 Bond Arms, Inc.
 The Texas Defender, Bond Arms .45acp/410 Shotshell carryconcealed.net

Firearm manufacturers of the United States
Companies based in Texas
Derringers